Burj Elnumra  is a Syrian village in Al-Dana Nahiyah in Harem District, Idlib.  According to the Syria Central Bureau of Statistics (CBS), it had a population of 656 in the 2004 census.

References 

Populated places in Harem District